Gary Hamish Orr (born 11 May 1967) is a Scottish professional golfer.

Career
Orr was born in Helensburgh, Scotland. He turned professional in 1988 and became a member of the European Tour in 1993. His two wins on the Tour both came in 2000, at the Algarve Portuguese Open and the Victor Chandler British Masters. He also had his highest finish on the European Tour Order of Merit that season, placing tenth.

Since turning 50 in May 2017, Orr has played on the European Senior Tour. He was runner-up in the Willow Senior Golf Classic in both 2017 and 2018 before his first win on the tour in the 2018 Scottish Senior Open.

Professional wins (5)

European Tour wins (2)

Other wins (1)
1991 Sunderland of Scotland Masters

European Senior Tour wins (2)

Results in major championships

Note: Orr never played in the Masters Tournament.

CUT = missed the half-way cut
"T" = tied

Results in World Golf Championships

1Cancelled due to 9/11

QF, R16, R32, R64 = Round in which player lost in match play
"T" = Tied
NT = No tournament

Team appearances
Amateur
European Boys' Team Championship (representing Scotland): 1985
Professional
Alfred Dunhill Cup (representing Scotland): 1998, 1999, 2000
Seve Trophy (representing Great Britain & Ireland): 2000
World Cup (representing Scotland): 2000

See also
2011 European Tour Qualifying School graduates
2012 European Tour Qualifying School graduates

References

External links

Scottish male golfers
European Tour golfers
European Senior Tour golfers
1967 births
Living people